is the 12th studio album by Japanese singer/songwriter Mari Hamada, released on March 20, 1993 by MCA Victor. Produced by Marc Tanner, the album coincided with the 10th anniversary of her music career. The album was reissued alongside Hamada's past releases on January 15, 2014.

Six of the album's tracks are included in Hamada' 1993 international release Introducing... Mari Hamada. The 1994 international follow-up All My Heart features an English version of "Private Heaven" and an acoustic re-arrangement of "Company".

Anti-Heroine was Hamada's second album (after Return to Myself) to hit No. 1 on Oricon's albums chart. It was also certified Platinum by the RIAJ. The 2014 reissue peaked at No. 267.

Track listing

Personnel 
 Michael Landau – guitar
 Brett Garsed – guitar
 Craig Stull – guitar
 Tommy Girvin – guitar
 Leland Sklar – bass
 John Pierce – bass
 Paul Mirkovich – keyboards
 Kim Bullard – keyboards
 Mike Baird – drums
 Steve Klong – drums
 Tommy Girvin – electric sitar
 Donna Delory – backing vocals

Charts

Certification

References

External links 
  (Mari Hamada)
  (Universal Music Japan)
 
 

1993 albums
Japanese-language albums
Mari Hamada albums
Universal Music Japan albums